Kurt Fevella is an American politician serving as a member of the Hawaii Senate, representing the 19th District since 2018. He is the first Republican to be elected to the Hawaii Senate since Sam Slom in 2014. As a result of being the only Republican in the Senate, he is the de facto Minority Leader.

Career

Fevella was born and raised in Ewa Beach, graduating from James Campbell High School. Before running for office, Fevella was a school custodian at Ewa Makai Middle School. He became interested in community service and politics after he began attending church during the 1990s. He served on the Ewa Neighborhood board and is the president of the Ewa Lions Club.

Fevella ran in 2012 for District 40 of the Hawaii House of Representatives and lost. In 2018, Fevella defeated Rep. Matt LoPresti to represent District 19 in the Hawaii Senate by 116 votes in an upset.

References

External links
Hawaii State Legislature – Senator Kurt Fevella official government site
Campaign site
 

|-

1967 births
21st-century American politicians
Republican Party Hawaii state senators
People from Honolulu County, Hawaii
Living people
Asian conservatism in the United States